Cristiano Moraes de Oliveira (born 28 September 1983), known simply as Cristiano, is a Brazilian retired footballer who played as an attacking midfielder.

He spent most of his professional career in Portugal, amassing Primeira Liga totals of 135 games and 17 goals over the course of eight seasons, almost exclusively with Paços de Ferreira.

Club career
Born in Manaus, Amazonas, Cristiano started playing football with two local clubs, Nacional Futebol Clube and São Raimundo Esporte Clube (AM), representing the latter on loan. In August 2005 he moved to Portugal and joined F.C. Paços de Ferreira, being rarely used in his debut season in the Primeira Liga (eight appearances, all as a substitute).

In the 2006–07 campaign, Cristiano contributed with 26 matches – two goals, one of them in a 1–1 home draw against Sporting CP on 17 February 2007– as Paços finished in sixth position, qualifying to the UEFA Cup for the first time in the club's history. He continued to feature regularly for the northerners in the following years, scoring a career-best seven goals in 2008–09.

On 6 November 2009, Cristiano netted twice as Paços won 3–0 at C.F. Belenenses. Shortly after, in the following January transfer window, he moved to PAOK FC in Greece, signing a two-and-a-half-year contract; after only a few games he suffered an anterior cruciate ligament injury, being sidelined for about six months.

Cristiano returned to Portugal in late January 2011, joining Sporting as a free agent and reuniting with former Paços de Ferreira manager Paulo Sérgio. In June, after just five competitive appearances, he was released and signed a two-year deal with S.C. Beira-Mar the following month.

References

External links

CBF data 

1983 births
Living people
People from Manaus
Brazilian footballers
Association football midfielders
Campeonato Brasileiro Série B players
Campeonato Brasileiro Série C players
Campeonato Brasileiro Série D players
Nacional Futebol Clube players
São Raimundo Esporte Clube footballers
Criciúma Esporte Clube players
Primeira Liga players
F.C. Paços de Ferreira players
Sporting CP footballers
S.C. Beira-Mar players
Vitória F.C. players
Super League Greece players
PAOK FC players
Brazilian expatriate footballers
Expatriate footballers in Portugal
Expatriate footballers in Greece
Brazilian expatriate sportspeople in Portugal
Brazilian expatriate sportspeople in Greece
Sportspeople from Amazonas (Brazilian state)